Naked Space may refer to:

 The Creature Wasn't Nice, a 1983 comedy film also known as Naked Space
 Naked Space, a science fiction universe created by author Stephen Euin Cobb